Stonewall Jackson Lake State Park is a state park along the shores of Stonewall Jackson Lake, an impoundment on the West Fork River in the U.S. state of West Virginia. The lake is a project of the United States Army Corps of Engineers. The original park was completed in 1990 and consisted of a campground, marina, multi-purpose building, and park offices.  The revenues generated from park activities were not able to support the debt from construction activities. Senator Robert C. Byrd developed a legislation that meant the State would not have to pay the Corps the $28 million debt if improvements to the State Park exceeded $28 million.

The state chose to venture with the private firm, McCabe-Henley Properties of Charleston.  McCabe-Henley, through a bond-issuing agency, sold $44 million in bonds to private markets and investors.  This provided a sum of $54 million ($10 million from the State and $44 million from investors),  which has been used to build the resort.  McCabe-Henley selected management company Benchmark Hospitality International to manage the State Park and Resort.  For marketing purposes, the resort is referred to as Stonewall Resort and Stonewall Resort State Park despite the legal name of the park still being Stonewall Jackson Lake State Park.

Features
 3 restaurants: Stillwaters, TJ Muskies, and Lightburns
 18 hole Signature Arnold Palmer Golf Course
 golf driving range
 16 conference rooms (15,000 sq ft. total)
 full-service spa
 fitness center
 hiking and mountain biking trails
 indoor swimming pool
 outdoor swimming pool
 fishing and boating in Stonewall Jackson Lake
 marina (with boat launch and rentals)
 125 passenger cruise boat
 18 cottages
 191 guest rooms and suites
 40 campsites
 All Commons areas Wireless Enabled, high speed wired available in room
 Cell Phone repeater system for entire lodge

Awards
 Winner of AAA Four Diamond Award 2004-2008
 "America's Best - Top 100 Resort Courses" 2006, 2007, 2008 - Golfweek
 "America's Best - 2005 Top 40 Best New Courses " - #8 - Golfweek
 "America's Best New Courses - 2003" - #2 - Golf Digest
 "Top Ten You Can Play - 2002" - Golf Magazine
 "Best New Course in 2002" - Seed Research Company

See also

Roanoke, West Virginia
List of West Virginia state parks

References

External links
 
 Stonewall Resort

Campgrounds in West Virginia
Golf clubs and courses in West Virginia
Protected areas established in 1990
1990 establishments in West Virginia
Protected areas of Lewis County, West Virginia
Resorts in West Virginia
State parks of West Virginia
IUCN Category III